Lindsay Ellis (born 27 July 1935) is  a former Australian rules footballer who played with Footscray in the Victorian Football League (VFL).

Notes

External links 		
		
		

		
Living people		
1935 births		
		
Australian rules footballers from Victoria (Australia)		
Western Bulldogs players